A  is a scrubbing brush for wet cleaning, of a style that is popular in Japan. Traditionally, tawashis were made from the hemp palm. In Japan, sponges used for rubbing and washing are now treated as forms of tawashi. 
A  is made of metal; steel, stainless steel, and brass are frequent choices. They may be used in removing scorching and rust.

Types 
Several synthetic polymers are frequently seen:
 A polyurethane sponge is sometimes called .
 Nylon sponges, sometimes called , are suitable for washing tough stains, but should not be used on delicate items.
 An  is made of acrylic, typically knitted or crocheted.
(The prefix eco- (エコ) indicates that it creates less pollution because it can be used without soap or detergents.)

See also 
 Sponge (tool)

References

Cleaning tools
Cleaning products